Gabriela Grillo (born 19 August 1952 in Duisburg) is a German businesswoman, equestrian and Olympic champion. She won a gold medal in team dressage and placed fourth in individual dressage at the 1976 Summer Olympics in Montreal.

Gabriela Grillo was a pupil at the Spanish Riding School in Vienna.

References

1952 births
Living people
German dressage riders
Olympic equestrians of West Germany
German female equestrians
Olympic gold medalists for West Germany
Equestrians at the 1976 Summer Olympics
Sportspeople from Duisburg
Spanish Riding School
Olympic medalists in equestrian
Medalists at the 1976 Summer Olympics